Jürgen Walter may refer to:

 Jürgen Walter (politician) (born 1968), German lawyer and politician composer
 Jürgen Walter (singer) (born 1943), German singer and composer
Jürgen Walter Franz Karl Warnke, German politician